Forster Fitzgerald Arbuthnot (21 May 1833 – 25 May 1901) was a notable British Orientalist and translator.

Biography
Arbuthnot's early career was spent as a civil servant in India; his last post was as Collector for the Bombay government. He was named after his grandfather, Field Marshal Sir John FitzGerald. His first name is sometimes spelled "Foster".

Arbuthnot was well versed in the ancient literature of India. He collaborated with his close friend Sir Richard Burton in the translations of two Sanskrit erotic texts, the Kama Sutra of Vatsayana (1883) and The Ananga Ranga (1885), both privately printed by the Kama Shastra Society (a fictitious organisation consisting of himself and Burton, a legal device to avoid obscenity laws).  He also wrote the books Arabic Authors, The Mysteries of Chronology, Early Ideas (1881, under the pseudonym Anaryan) and Sex Mythology, Including an Account of the Masculine Cross  (1898, privately printed), which attempts to trace the phallic origins of religious symbols. He edited the Rawżat aṣ-ṣafāʾ (روضة الصفا, ‘garden of purity’) by Mīr-Khvānd, translated by the Orientalist Edward Rehatsek from 1891 to 1894.

It is largely due to his work that several of the masterpieces of Arabic, Persian and Indian literature first became available in English translation.

Publications

Written

Translated

Edited

References 

 Mrs P S-M Arbuthnot Memories of the Arbuthnots (1920). George Allen & Unwin Ltd.

External links
 
 Arbuthnot, F.F. Arabic Authors: A Manual of Arabian History and Literature (Full text)
 

1833 births
1901 deaths
Arabic–English translators
Persian–English translators
Sanskrit–English translators
English translators
English non-fiction writers
Foster Fitzgerald Arbuthnot
English orientalists
Indian Civil Service (British India) officers
English male non-fiction writers
19th-century British translators
19th-century English male writers
Younger sons of baronets